Silver Jubilee is a celebration held to mark a 25th anniversary.

Silver Jubilee may also refer to:

 Silver Jubilee (Riders in the Sky album), 2003
 Silver Jubilee (Sex Pistols album), 2002
 Silver Jubilee (train), a named train of the London and North Eastern Railway (LNER)